Broken by Silence is the first studio EP by British synthpop band Mirrors.  The EP was first available during the Orchestral Manoeuvres in the Dark tour in Germany in November 2010 for which Mirrors were the support act.  On sale during the tour will be a CD EP entitled Broken By Silence which will not be available on-line.  The EP was later made available on the Skint Records website due to popular demand.

References

External links
 
 Broken by Silence: Skint Records website
 Mirrors discography

2010 EPs